Egan is a masculine given name which is borne by:

 Egan (Paiute), American name of Northern Paiute Indian leader Pony Blanket (died 1878)
 Egan Adams (born 1959), American former tennis player
 Egan Bernal (born 1997), Colombian road cyclist
 Egan Butcher (born 2000), Australian rugby league footballer
 Egan Chambers (1921–1994), Canadian politician
 Egan Frantz (born 1986), American Artist
 Egan Walker (born 1961), American lawyer and judge

Masculine given names